Ķ, ķ (k-cedilla) is the 17th letter of the Latvian alphabet.
In Latvian, it has the IPA value /c/.
In ISO 9, Ķ is the official Latin transliteration of the Cyrillic letter Қ.

External links

Omniglot - writing systems & languages of the world

K-cedilla